Chukwuma Akabueze (born 6 May 1989), nicknamed "Bentley", is a Nigerian professional footballer.

Club career
The former striker of Kwara United before he was taken to Odd Grenland in July 2007.  He has a very good left foot which he utilised in scoring a stunner against Zambia in the second round stage of the 2007 FIFA U-20 World Cup. His skill is another asset to him evident by the goal he scored in the 1–1 draw with Rosenborg BK on 2 August 2009. On 24 February 2011 he signed for SK Brann.

On 19 February 2013, Bentley transferred to Chinese Super League club Wuhan Zall.

International career
He was a member of the Nigerian team that took part in the 2007 FIFA U-20 World Cup in Canada in which they were eliminated in the quarter-final by Chile.

International goals
Scores and results list Nigeria's goal tally first.

References

External links

FIFA article on Chukwuma Akabueze

1989 births
People from Ilorin
Living people
Nigerian footballers
Nigeria under-20 international footballers
Nigeria international footballers
Association football wingers
Kwara United F.C. players
Odds BK players
SK Brann players
Wuhan F.C. players
Boluspor footballers
Ümraniyespor footballers
Bandırmaspor footballers
Eliteserien players
Chinese Super League players
TFF First League players
Nigerian expatriate footballers
Expatriate footballers in Norway
Nigerian expatriate sportspeople in Norway
Expatriate footballers in China
Nigerian expatriate sportspeople in China
Expatriate footballers in Turkey
Nigerian expatriate sportspeople in Turkey